Thunderclap may refer to:

 Thunder, the sound caused by lightning

Arts and entertainment
 Thunderclap (comics), a fictional superhero created by Marvel UK, a division of Marvel Comics
 Thunderclap (website), a crowdspeaking platform
 Thunderclap Newman, a late 1960s rock band
 Thunderclap, a fictional town in The Dark Tower by Stephen King
 Thunderclap, a 1921 American drama film directed by Richard Stanton
 "Thunderclap", a song by Bang Camaro from Bang Camaro II
 Thunderclap, the main antagonist in the 2015 Disney/Pixar animated film The Good Dinosaur

Other uses
 Thunder clap, a dance move
 Thunderclap headache, an intense headache that can be a sign of a medical emergency
 Thunderclap plan, a canceled German attack that was planned for August 1944
 The Delft Thunderclap, a historical accident in the city of Delft
 Thunderclap (security vulnerability), related to computer flaws
Viking Thunder Clap, a football chant

See also
 Clap (disambiguation)
 Thunder (disambiguation)
 Thunderbolt (disambiguation)